Ezkurra is a town and municipality located in the province and  autonomous community of Navarre, northern Spain. The town's name is from the Basque language of the locals.

References

External links
 EZKURRA in the Bernardo Estornés Lasa - Auñamendi Encyclopedia (Euskomedia Fundazioa) 

Municipalities in Navarre